Giuseppe (Joseph) Dominic Matarazzo (born November 12, 1925) is an American psychologist and a past president of the American Psychological Association (APA). He chaired the first medical psychology department in the United States and has been credited with much of the early work in health psychology.

Biography

Early life
Matarazzo was born in Caiazzo, Italy.  He attended school in New York and then joined the United States Navy. He attended Columbia University and Brown University before earning a PhD in clinical psychology at Northwestern University. Matarazzo had decided upon a career in psychology while talking with a physician aboard a naval ship.

Career
Early in his career, Matarazzo taught psychology at the Washington University School of Medicine and Harvard Medical School. From 1957 to 1996, Matarazzo was the founding chairman of the medical psychology department at Oregon Health Sciences University (OHSU), the first such department in the U.S. with administrative autonomy. In 1989, Matarazzo served as president of the APA. He is a professor emeritus at OHSU, where his research interests included behavioral cardiology and neuropsychology. He is credited with naming and laying the foundation for the field of health psychology. He was the first president of the APA's Division of Health Psychology in 1978.

In addition to his service with the APA, Matarazzo has served as president of the American Psychological Foundation, the Oregon Mental Health Association, the International Council of Psychologists, the Academy of Behavioral Medicine Research and the American Association of State Psychology Boards.

Legacy
The Joseph D. Matarazzo Award for Distinguished Contributions to Psychology in Academic Health Centers is awarded by the Association of Psychologists in Academic Health Centers to recognize "outstanding psychologists whose work in medical school and health care settings has enhanced the roles of psychologists in education, research, and clinical care."

In 2015, Newsweek mentioned Matarazzo in an article on the involvement of APA officials in U.S. interrogation programs and torture. When psychologists had complained about the involvement of their profession in such interrogation programs, Matarazzo had authored a memo stating that sleep deprivation did not amount to torture. He later held owned shares in a company that had designed the interrogation programs.

Personal
Matarazzo's wife Ruth is also a successful psychologist. She is a professor emerita at OHSU.

References

Living people
1925 births
Columbia University alumni
Brown University alumni
Northwestern University alumni
Presidents of the American Psychological Association
Italian emigrants to the United States
21st-century American psychologists
United States Navy personnel of World War II
20th-century American psychologists